The 2003 Insurrextion was the fourth annual and final Insurrextion professional wrestling pay-per-view (PPV) event produced by the American promotion, World Wrestling Entertainment (WWE). It was held exclusively for wrestlers from the promotion's Raw brand division. The event took place on June 7, 2003, at the Telewest Arena in Newcastle, England and was broadcast exclusively in the United Kingdom. It was the only Insurrextion produced under the WWE name, as the promotion was renamed from World Wrestling Federation (WWF) to WWE just two days after the previous year's event. 

Seven matches were contested at the event, with two dark matches. In the main event, Triple H defeated Kevin Nash in a Street Fight to retain the World Heavyweight Championship. In other prominent matches, Christian defeated Booker T to retain the WWE Intercontinental Championship, Kane & Rob Van Dam defeated La Résistance (René Duprée and Sylvain Grenier) to retain the World Tag Team Championship, and in the opening bout, Jazz defeated Trish Stratus to retain the WWE Women's Championship.

Insurrextion was discontinued after this 2003 event due to the promotion's discontinuation of UK-exclusive PPVs after this event. Following this event, WWE did not produce another pay-per-view outside of North America until 2018 with that year's Greatest Royal Rumble, which was held in Saudi Arabia. The 2003 Insurrextion would also be the final PPV to take place in the United Kingdom until Clash at the Castle in 2022 and in England specifically until Money in the Bank in 2023.

Production

Background
Insurrextion was an annual United Kingdom-exclusive pay-per-view (PPV) produced by the American professional wrestling promotion, World Wrestling Entertainment (WWE), since 2000. The 2003 event was the fourth event in the Insurrextion chronology and was held on June 7 at the Telewest Arena in Newcastle, England. Like the previous year, it featured wrestlers exclusively from the Raw brand. It would also be the only Insurrextion produced under the WWE name, as the company was renamed from World Wrestling Federation (WWF) to WWE just two days after the previous year's event.

Storylines
The event featured nine professional wrestling matches and two pre-show matches that involved different wrestlers from pre-existing scripted feuds and storylines. Wrestlers portrayed villains, heroes, or less distinguishable characters in the scripted events that built tension and culminated in a wrestling match or series of matches.

Aftermath
The 2003 Insurrextion would be the final Insurrextion event, as WWE discontinued UK-exclusive PPVs after this event as the company began to periodically broadcast its weekly television shows, Raw and SmackDown!, from the UK in 2004. WWE would not hold another PPV outside of North America until the Greatest Royal Rumble in April 2018, which was held in Saudi Arabia and was the first in a series of PPVs held in that country. In September 2022, WWE produced its first UK PPV in 19 years as Clash at the Castle, which was broadcast worldwide instead of only in the UK. The 2003 Insurrextion was also WWE's final PPV to be held in England until Money in the Bank in 2023.

Results

Other on-screen talent

See also

Professional wrestling in the United Kingdom

References

2003 WWE pay-per-view events
2003 in England
Events in England
Professional wrestling in England
WWE Insurrextion
June 2003 events in the United Kingdom
WWE Raw